HR 2131 (HD 41047) is a solitary star in the southern constellation Columba. It has an apparent magnitude of 5.52, allowing it to be faintly seen with the naked eye.

HR 2131 has a stellar classification of K5 III, indicating that it is a red giant. It has 1.81 times the mass of the Sun and is 2.19 billion years old.

References

External Links
Starview/HD 41047

K-type giants
Columba (constellation)
041047
2131
028524
Columbae, 67